The square root of 7 is the positive real number that, when multiplied by itself, gives the prime number 7. It is more precisely called the principal square root of 7, to distinguish it from the negative number with the same property. This number appears in various geometric and number-theoretic contexts. It can be denoted in surd form as:

and in exponent form as:

It is an irrational algebraic number.  The first sixty significant digits of its decimal expansion are:
.

More than a million decimal digits of the square root of seven have been published.

Rational approximations

The extraction of decimal-fraction approximations to square roots by various methods has used the square root of 7 as an example or exercise in textbooks, for hundreds of years.  Different numbers of digits after the decimal point are shown: 5 in 1773 and 1852, 3 in 1835, 6 in 1808, and 7 in 1797.
An extraction by Newton's method (approximately) was illustrated in 1922, concluding that it is 2.646 "to the nearest thousandth".

For a family of good rational approximations, the square root of 7 can be expressed as the continued fraction

  

The successive partial evaluations of the continued fraction, which are called its convergents, approach :

Their numerators are 2, 3, 5, 8, 37, 45, 82, 127, 590, 717, 1307, 2024, 9403, 11427, 20830, 32257… , and their denominators are 1, 1, 2, 3, 14, 17, 31,  48, 223, 271,  494,  765, 3554, 4319, 7873, 12192,….

Approximate decimal equivalents improve linearly (number of digits proportional to convergent number) at a rate of less than one digit per step:

All but the first of these satisfy the Pell's equation above.

The Babylonian method is equivalent to Newton's method for root finding applied to the polynomial .  The Newton's method update,  is equal to  when .  The method therefore converges quadratically (number of accurate decimal digits proportional to the square of the number of Newton or Babylonian steps).

Geometry

In plane geometry, the square root of 7 can be constructed via a sequence of dynamic rectangles, that is, as the largest diagonal of those rectangles illustrated here.

The minimal enclosing rectangle of an equilateral triangle of edge length 2 has a diagonal of the square root of 7.

Outside of mathematics

On the reverse of the current US one-dollar bill, the "large inner box" has a length-to-width ratio of the square root of 7, and a diagonal of 6.0 inches, to within measurement accuracy.

See also

 Square root
 Square root of 2
 Square root of 3
 Square root of 5
 Square root of 6

References

Mathematical constants
Quadratic irrational numbers